Howard S.H. Shyr is a Taiwanese politician. He was the Chairperson of the National Communications Commission (NCC) of the Executive Yuan from 2012 to 2016.

Education
Shyr obtained his bachelor's and master's degrees in law from National Taiwan University in 1988 and 1992, respectively. He then obtained his doctoral degree from Hamburg University in Germany.

NCC Ministry

Telecoms carrier user complaints
At the end of May 2013, speaking at the Legislative Yuan, Shyr said that the NCC would release ranked lists of telecommunication carrier companies based on their level of customer complaints in the first quarter of 2013. This decision was made to encourage the telecommunication companies to improve their service.

References

Political office-holders in the Republic of China on Taiwan
Living people
Year of birth missing (living people)
National Taiwan University alumni